The 2000 United States presidential election in North Carolina took place on November 7, 2000, and was part of the 2000 United States presidential election. Voters chose 14 representatives, or electors, to the Electoral College, who voted for president and vice president.

North Carolina was won by Governor George W. Bush with a 12.83% margin of victory. Bush won most of the counties and congressional districts of the state. He won 9 of the 12 districts. He also won the most populated counties of the state including Forsyth County with 56%, Wake County with 53%, Guilford County with 51%, and Mecklenburg County with 51% of the vote. , this is the last election in which Guilford County and Mecklenburg County voted for a Republican presidential candidate and the last election in which Columbus County, Chowan County, and Tyrrell County voted for a Democratic presidential candidate.

Results

Results by county

Counties that flipped from Democratic to Republican
Buncombe (Largest city: Asheville)
Camden (Largest city: Camden)
Caswell (Largest city: Yanceyville)
Duplin (Largest city: Wallace)
Franklin (Largest city: Wake Forest)
Guilford (Largest city: Greensboro)
Haywood (Largest city: Waynesville)
Hyde (Largest city: Swanquarter)
Jackson (Largest city: Sylva)
Jones (Largest city: Maysville)
Madison (Largest city: Mars Hill)
Mecklenburg (Largest city: Charlotte)
Montgomery (Largest city: Troy)
Perquimans (Largest city: Hertford)
Swain (Largest city: Cherokee)

By congressional district
Bush won 9 of 12 congressional districts, including two held by Democrats.

Electors 

Technically the voters of North Carolina cast their ballots for electors: representatives to the Electoral College. North Carolina is allocated 14 electors because it has 12 congressional districts and 2 senators. All candidates who appear on the ballot or qualify to receive write-in votes must submit a list of 14 electors, who pledge to vote for their candidate and his or her running mate. Whoever wins the majority of votes in the state is awarded all 14 electoral votes. Their chosen electors then vote for president and vice president. Although electors are pledged to their candidate and running mate, they are not obligated to vote for them. An elector who votes for someone other than his or her candidate is known as a faithless elector.

The electors of each state and the District of Columbia met on December 18, 2000 to cast their votes for president and vice president. The Electoral College itself never meets as one body. Instead the electors from each state and the District of Columbia met in their respective capitols. 

The following were the members of the Electoral College from the state. All were pledged to and voted for George W. Bush and Dick Cheney:
Fran Barnhart
Claude Billings
Sam Currin
Tom Dwiggins
A. Dial Gray
Barbara Holt
Marshall Hurley
Margaret King
Jeff Mixon
Joe L. Morgan
Steve Rader
Robert Rector
Dewitt Rhoades
Linda Young

References 

2000
North Carolina
2000 North Carolina elections